Chinese Soviet Republic may refer to - 

 Chinese Soviet Republic, the sovereign, multi-territoried communist state declared in November 1931 and destroyed by successive and multifarious Encirclement Campaigns
 Jiangxi-Fujian Soviet (or Jiangxi Soviet), the CSR's largest component territory and seat of its central government which in flight took the most famous route of the Long March 
 Haifeng Soviet, the first Chinese Soviet, established in November 1927 on the Guangdong coast